Leica Camera AG is a German company that manufactures cameras, optical lenses, photographic lenses, binoculars, rifle scopes and microscopes. The company was founded by Ernst Leitz in 1869 (Ernst Leitz Wetzlar), in Wetzlar, Germany.

In 1986, the Leitz company changed its name to Leica, due to the fame of the Leica trade-name. The name Leica is derived from the first three letters of the founder's surname (Leitz) and the first two of the word camera: lei-ca (LEItz CAmera). At this time, Leica relocated its factory from Wetzlar to the nearby town of Solms.

Leica Camera AG is 55% owned by Austrian investment firm ACM Projektentwicklung GmbH, and 45% owned by The Blackstone Group which licenses the Leica brand name from the Danaher Corporation-owned Leica Microsystems GmbH.

History 
From the year 1907 to the 1950s, the buildings that formed Leica factory were built on Ernst Leitz Street in Wetzlar, and remained until 1986, when the factory was moved to the city of Solms. The Wetzlar factory was located on the opposite side of the administrative building of 1957 and formed a special urban architecture; it is upstream from the slope of Kalsmunt and forms a structurally attractive graduation from the skyscrapers to the ruins of Kalsmunt Castle.

In the last decades of the 19th century, Ernst Leitz moved its production facilities to the slopes of Kalsmunt with sufficient residential buildings and workshops on the Laufdorfer Weg. 

At the turn of the century, the production of optical devices expanded so much that it originated the first skyscrapers in the city of Wetzlar. The oldest part of this row of tall buildings is now hidden by a new building at the Schützenstraße. The first plans of the architect Jean Schmidt in 1907 show a brick building on a stone base, which was covered by a sloping roof and a slate roof. However, in the same year, it was decided to use the new construction of concrete skeletons and a simpler façade design. The four-story building is divided into six groups of windows, each of which has three windows. Narrow wall patterns and lightly embedded parapets summarize the three lowest floors. The fourth floor is visually separated from the lower part of the building by a very distant cornice. On either side of the central building there was a hip roof with high ceilings. The mansard's floor expanded as production and workers also increased. Only a few years later, Leitz again demanded the construction of a tall building. After the planning of Jean Schmidt, contractor Robert Schneider built a four-story building in 1911.

The basement building was made of reinforced concrete with brick stairs. Again, the original plan, which provided a horizontal structure of the building through the cornucopia, was abandoned in favor of a simpler façade design. In the ten-axis building, similar to the oldest skyscraper, the lower levels are grouped by pilasters. The space between the two skyscrapers (which originally had been provided with subsequent buildings) had to be closed by another building in the early 1930s. Once again, it was Jean Schmidt, who prepared the plans for a first seven-story skyscraper. The still existing façade drawings show the columns with arches on the ground floor and that are fitted between a long strip of windows with excessive pilasters. The general design shows a mixture of very graphic elements and remains of curved Modernist forms that recall the buildings by Joseph Maria Olbrich at Mathildenhöhe of Darmstadt.

In 1936, the architect presented a completely revised plan. The plan was now made up of eight floors for Leica production. The building was built with a concrete construction modeled from the production halls of Opel in Rüsselsheim, Zeiss in Jena and Wernerwerk in Berlin. It was possible to access all the floors through two stairs.

The government of the city and the district finally approved a construction of eight floors with a loggia-like ninth floor, that later was closed. Due to the urban landscape that characterized the size of the building, the planning of the district government was initially rejected because of a simple and unsatisfactory exterior design. Even so, the building was built in 1938 between the two oldest skyscrapers. In 1950, west of the skyscraper of 1911, a skyscraper of similar construction with nine floors was added.

Before WWII 

The first 35 mm film Leica prototypes were built by Oskar Barnack at Ernst Leitz Optische Werke, Wetzlar, in 1913. Some say the original Leica was intended as a compact camera for landscape photography, particularly during mountain hikes, but other sources indicate the camera was intended for test exposures with 35mm motion picture film. The Leica was the first practical 35 mm camera that used standard cinema 35 mm film. The Leica transports the film horizontally, extending the frame size to 24×36mm with a 2:3 aspect ratio, instead of the 18×24 mm of cinema cameras, which transport the film vertically.

The Leica had several model iterations, and in 1923, Barnack convinced his boss, Ernst Leitz II, to make a preproduction series of 31 cameras for the factory and outside photographers to test. Though the prototypes received mixed reception, Ernst Leitz decided in 1924 to produce the camera. It was an immediate success when introduced at the 1925 Leipzig Spring Fair as the Leica I (for Leitz camera). The focal plane shutter has a range from 1/20 to 1/500 second, in addition to a Z for Zeit (time) position.

Barnack conceived the Leica as a small camera that produced a small negative. To make large photos by enlargement, (the "small negative, large picture" concept) requires that the camera have high quality lenses that could create well-defined negatives. Barnack tried a Zeiss Tessar on his early prototype camera, but because the Tessar was designed for the 18×24 mm cine format, it inadequately covered the Leica's 24×36mm negative. Barnack resorted to a Leitz Mikro-Summar 1:4.5/42 mm lens for the prototype, but to achieve resolution necessary for satisfactory enlargement, the 24x36 mm format needed a lens designed specially for it. The first Leica lens was a 50 mm  design based on the Cooke triplet of 1893, adapted by Max Berek at Leitz. The lens has five elements in three groups—the third group being three cemented elements—and was initially named the Leitz Anastigmat. Unlike other triplets, the Leitz Anastigmat has the diaphragm between the first and second elements. When the Leica was first vended, this lens was renamed the ELMAX, for E Leitz and MAX Berek. By 1925, the Leitz laboratories had produced glasses with improved optical properties, and Professor Berek designed an improved version of the ELMAX named the ELMAR that had four elements in three groups. The third group was simplified to two cemented elements, which was easier and cheaper to make. Professor Berek had two dogs, Hektor and Rex. The first of these, Hektor, gave his name to a series of Leica lenses, and the name of the second appeared in the SummaREX.

In 1930, the Leica I Schraubgewinde was first produced. It had an exchangeable lens system based on a 39mm diameter screw thread, often referred to as " Leica Thread Mount" or LTM. In addition to the 50 mm normal lens, a 35 mm wide angle and a 135 mm telephoto lens were initially available. During the mid-1930s, a legendary soft-focus lens, the Thambar 90 mm  was designed, and made in small numbers between 1935 and 1949, no more than 3000 units. It is now a rare collector's item. In 2017, a new version was produced, costing $6,495. A lens from the original series can fetch between $3,000 and $8,000, depending on condition.

The Leica II was first produced in 1932, with a built in rangefinder coupled to the lens focusing mechanism. This model has a separate viewfinder (showing a reduced image) and rangefinder. In 1932, the flange to filmplane was standardised to 28.8mm, first implemented on Leica model C, and the Leica Standard the next year.

The Leica III added slow shutter speeds down to 1 second, and the model IIIa added the 1/1000 second shutter speed. The IIIa is the last model made before Barnack's death, and therefore the last model for which he was wholly responsible. Leitz continued to refine the original design through to 1957. The final version, the IIIg, includes a large viewfinder with several framelines. These models all have a functional combination of circular dials and square windows.

Early Leica cameras bear the initials D.R.P., which stands for Deutsches Reichspatent, the name for German patents before May 1945. This is probably a reference to German patent No. 384071 "Rollfilmkamera" granted to Ernst Leitz, Optische Werke in Wetzlar, on November 3, 1923.

The company had always had progressive labor policies which encouraged the retention of skilled workers, many of whom were Jewish. Ernst Leitz II, who began managing the company in 1920, responded to the election of Hitler in 1933 by helping Jews to leave Germany, by "assigning" hundreds (even if they were not actually employees) to overseas sales offices where they were helped to find jobs. The effort intensified after Kristallnacht in 1938, until the borders were closed in September 1939. The extent of what came to be known as the "Leica Freedom Train" only became public after his death, well after the war.

After WWII 
After the war, Leitz continued to produce the late versions of the Leica II and the Leica III through the 1950s. However, in 1954, Leitz introduced the Leica M3, with the new Leica M mount, a bayonet-like lens mount. The new camera also combined the rangefinder and viewfinder into one large, bright viewfinder with a brighter double image in the center. This system also introduced a system of parallax compensation and a new rubberized, reliable, focal-plane shutter. Leica continues to refine this model (the latest versions being the MP and MA, both of which have framelines for 28, 35, 50, 75, 90, and 135 mm lenses, which show automatically upon mounting).

In 1952, Günther Leitz decided to establish Ernst Leitz Canada at Midland, Ontario.

Post-war models bear the initials DBP, standing for Deutsches Bundespatent (Federal German Patent), instead of the DRP (Deutsches Reich patent) found on pre-war models. A number of camera companies have built models based on the Leica rangefinder design. These include the Leotax, Nicca and early Canon models in Japan, the Kardon in USA, the Reid in England and the FED and Zorki in the USSR.

In the 1970s, Walter Mandler introduced computer aided design in optical engineering.

 Factory upgrade 
Until at least the mid-1950s, Leitz offered factory upgrades of earlier Leica cameras to the current model's specifications. The upgraded cameras retained their original serial number.

Single-lens reflex cameras 
From 1964, Leica produced a series of single-lens reflex cameras, beginning with the Leicaflex, followed by the Leicaflex SL, the Leicaflex SL2, and then the R series from R3 to R7, made in collaboration with the Minolta Corporation. The Leica R8 was entirely designed and manufactured by Leica. The final model was the Leica R9, which could be fitted with the Digital Module back. Leica was slow to produce an auto-exposure model, and never made a Leica R model that included auto-focusing. Leica's U.S. official website announced (March 25, 2009) that the R-series has been discontinued. The reason given was that "new camera developments have significantly affected the sales of Leica R cameras and lenses resulting in a dramatic decrease in the number sold. Sadly, therefore, there is no longer an economic basis on which to keep the Leica R-System in the Leica production programme."

Conceptually intermediate between the Rangefinder Leicas and the SLR Leicas was the Leica Visoflex System, a mirror reflex box that attached to the lens mount of Leica rangefinders (separate versions were made for the screwmount and M series bodies) and accepted lenses made especially for the Visoflex System. Rather than using the camera's rangefinder, focusing was accomplished via a groundglass screen. A coupling released both mirror and shutter to make the exposure. Camera rangefinders are inherently limited in their ability to accurately focus long focal-length lenses and the mirror reflex box permitted much longer length lenses. Throughout its history, Leitz has been responsible for numerous optical innovations, such as aspherical production lenses, multicoated lenses, and rare earth lenses.

The earliest Leica reflex housing was the PLOOT (Leitz's five letter code for its products), announced in 1935, along with the 200 mm  Telyt Lens. This date is significant because that it places Leica among the 35 mm SLR pioneers. Moreover, until the 1964 introduction of the Leicaflex, the PLOOT and Visoflex were Leica's only SLR offerings. A redesigned PLOOT was introduced by Leica in 1951 as the Visoflex I. This was followed by a much more compact Visoflex II in 1960 (which was the only Visoflex version available in both LTM (screwmount) and M-bayonet) and the Visoflex III with instant-return mirror in 1964. Leica lenses for the Visoflex system included focal lengths of 65, 180 (rare), 200, 280, 400, 560, and 800mm. In addition, the optical groups of many rangefinder lenses could be removed and attached to the Visoflex via a system of adapters. The Visoflex system was discontinued in 1984.

Leica offered a wide range of accessories. For instance, LTM (screwmount) lenses were easily usable on M cameras via an adapter. Similarly, Visoflex lenses could be used on the Leicaflex and R cameras with an adapter. Furthermore, certain LTM and M rangefinder lenses featured removable optical groups that could mount via adapters on the Visoflex system, thus making them usable as rangefinder or SLR lenses for Visoflex-equipped Screwmount and M rangefinder cameras, as well as being usable on Leicaflex and R cameras. Leica also offered focusing systems, such as the Focorapid and Televit, that could replace certain lenses’ helicoid mounts for sports and natural-life telephotography.

'Leitz' to 'Leica' 

In 1986, the Leitz company changed its name to Leica (LEItz CAmera), due to the fame of the Leica tradename. At this time, Leica relocated its factory from Wetzlar (Germany) to the nearby town of Solms (Germany). In 1996, Leica Camera separated from the Leica Group and became a publicly owned company. In 1998, the Leica group was divided into two independent units: Leica Microsystems and Leica Geosystems.

On 1 October 2012, Leica Camera AG was delisted from the Frankfurt Stock Exchange after Lisa Germany Holding GmbH acquired the remaining minority shares stock resulting in the company being owned privately.

On 26 November 2013, Leica Camera AG announced the purchase of Sinar Photography AG, Zurich, the Swiss manufacturer of view cameras.

In May 2014, Leica Camera AG finished building a new factory at Leitz Park 1 in the new industrial part of Wetzlar and relocated back to the city where it started.

In April 2019, a television commercial for Leica titled "The Hunt" was released online. The commercial depicts photojournalists in war-torn and politically unstable environments; one of whom takes a photograph of the Tank Man during the 1989 Tiananmen Square protests. Following censorship of the Leica brand on Sina Weibo, Leica revoked the commercial and sought to distance themselves from it, claiming the company did not sanction its production.

In September 2022, Leica announced Cine 1, a laser projector, slated for release in 2023. The new model is Leica's return to digital projectors, which the company produced under the Pradovit brand.

Notable adherents and photographers 

Leica cameras are particularly associated with street photography, especially in the latter twentieth century; they were used by photographers such as Henri Cartier-Bresson and Sebastião Salgado.

Antique trade and collecting 
Leica cameras, lenses, accessories and sales literature are collectibles. There are dozens of Leica books and collector's guides, notably the three-volume Leica, an Illustrated History by James L. Lager. Early or rare cameras and accessories can have very high prices. For instance, an anonymous buyer bought a rare 1923 Leica camera for 2.6 million euros ($2.8 million) at an auction in Vienna. Notably, Leica cameras sporting military markings are highly valued; this started a market for refurbished Soviet copies with fake markings.

Cameras 

The earliest Leica prototypes were developed by the company Ernst Leitz GmbH during the first years of the 20th century, but marketing did not commence until the mid-1920s. The Leicas were innovative, by orienting the image frame sideways for the 35 mm film as opposed to the cine-camera tradition of across the film strip. The cameras were compact with collapsible lenses, for hiking and biking. The rangefinder feature was added to the Leica II in 1932, and that year both rangefinder and viewfinder cameras became available with interchangeable lenses. In 1933 the Leica III offered slow-speed shutter controls and a fast 1/1000 s shutter speed, and various iterations of the III (a,b,c,d,f,&g) series became the flagship models and best sellers into the late 1950s. Further iterations of models I and II were offered but did not sell well.

Prior to WWII, Leica and competing Contax cameras from Zeiss Ikon were considered to be the finest 35 mm cameras, but post-WWII the companies had competition from Soviet and Japanese copies. During the 1950s Japanese quality and innovation, along with low pricing, devastated the European camera industry. Leica became an expensive type of camera bought largely by professional or serious photographers. However, the advent of reflex camera technology made rangefinders somewhat obsolete, leaving Leica the main product of a diminishing market segment. Leica has remained a notable tradename into the 21st Century.

The original producer of the cameras, Ernst Leitz GmbH, is now three independent companies: Leica Camera AG, Leica Geosystems AG, and Leica Microsystems GmbH, which manufacture cameras, geo survey equipment, and microscopes, respectively. Leica Microsystems GmbH owns the Leica brand and licenses its use to the other two companies.

Early models 
 Leica I – was first introduced to the market at the 1925 spring fair in Leipzig, based on the Ur-Leica prototype developed by Barnack in 1913 and Prototyp 1 developed in 1923. Followed by Leica Luxur and Leica Compur (a total of 60,586 of the Leica I, Luxur, and Compur models were made). Interchangeable lenses for these were introduced in 1930.
Leica 35mm series with interchangeable lens screw mount style Leica bodies:
 Leica Standard – 1932. The first Leica camera was designed with a film-to-lens flange distance of 28.8 millimeters.
 Leica II – 1932. The first Leica camera with a rangefinder.
 Leica III – 1933. Leica incorporated slow shutter speeds on this model.

M-series rangefinder

M (rangefinder) film series 
The "M" within the nomenclature of this series of cameras comes from the first initial of "Meßsucher" (or "Messsucher"), which is the German word for "Rangefinder".
 M3 – 1954–1966 (Total 200,000 units manufactured) Introduced at the German photokina exhibition in 1954, the M3 was the first of the M series Leicas, a line that is still manufactured today, and featured the first Leica body with a bayonet-style mount for interchangeable lenses. In an advertisement from 1956, it was regarded as a "lifetime investment in perfect photography". The M3 has a .92 magnification finder, the highest of any M camera made. The price of this high magnification was that a 35 mm lens required "goggles" that fit in front of the view/rangefinder windows to facilitate a wider view. The M3 advanced film via a lever rather than a knob, the first M3s required two strokes to advance the film, after 1958 M3's were single stroke. Early M3s lacked a frame preview selector lever to switch between frame lines.
 MP – 1956–57 (Total of 402 sets were manufactured). The original MP was based on the M3 and could be fitted with a Leicavit trigger winding device. MP originally stood for "M Professional"; it was intended as a photojournalist's camera.
 M2 – 1958–1967 (88,000 sets were manufactured). A scaled-down and lower-cost version of the M3, the M2 had a simplified rangefinder of 0.72 magnification, allowing easier use of 35 mm lenses. The 0.72 magnification became the standard viewfinder magnification for future M cameras. The M2 lacked the self-resetting film frame counter of its predecessor.
 M1 – 1959–1964 (9,392 sets were manufactured). A stripped-down version of the M2 for scientific/technical use, the M1 was a viewfinder camera with no built-in rangefinder. Replaced in 1965 by the MD (with no viewfinder at all), and the MDa (based on the M4) (1967), and finally the MD-2 (based on the M4-2) (1980).
 M4 – 1967–1975 (50,000 sets were manufactured); 1974–75 (6,500 sets were manufactured). With added rangefinder frame lines for 35mm and 135mm lenses. Introduced the canted rewind crank (the previous Ms had rewind knobs). The M5 was the last M camera to have a self-timer.
 M5 – 1971–1975 (31,400 sets were manufactured). With added integral TTL light meter. First Leica with a light meter, a mechanical swinging-arm CDS cell positioned behind the lens. The added functionality required a redesigned, larger body compared with the traditional M3 dimensions. Certain wide-angle lenses (early 21 mm f4.0 and f3.4) could not be used in the camera without modification because of the possibility of damage to the rear element of the lens or the meter arm. For similar reasons, collapsible lenses could not be collapsed on the M5. These restrictions also held true for the Leica CL (below). With the M4, the last M camera has a self-timer.
 CL – 1973–1976 (the compact Leica). Leitz Minolta CL introduced two lenses special to that model: the 40mm Summicron-C f2 and 90mm Elmar-C f4. Internal metering is similar to the M5 – CDS cell on a swinging stalk. The CL is also notable for being the only M-bayonet camera to have a vertically travelling shutter. Minolta later manufactured and sold an improved electronic version, the Minolta CLE with Auto Exposure, Off-The-Film TTL metering and TTL Flash metering, together with three M-Rokkor lenses, the 40mm /f2, 28mm/f2.,8 and 90mm/f4.
 M4-2 – 1977–1980 (17,000 sets were manufactured). First M manufactured since 1975, with stronger gears to support a motor drive. It was the first M with a hot shoe for electronic flash. No self-timer. Made in Canada.
 M4-P – 1980–1986. Added rangefinder frame lines for the 28mm and 75mm lenses.

 M6 "Classic" – 1984–1998. A camera that first combined the M3 form factor with a modern, off-the-shutter light meter with no moving parts and LED arrows in the viewfinder. Informally referred to as the M6 "Classic" to distinguish it from the "M6 TTL" models, and to indicate its "Classic" M3 dimensions.
 M6J – 1994. A collector's edition of 1,640 cameras to celebrate the 40th anniversary of the Leica M System. Notable for its introduction of the 0.85 magnification finder, the first high-magnification finder since 1966, and the basis for the 0.85 cameras to follow starting in 1998.
 M6 0.85 – 1998. The M6 could be optionally ordered with a .85 magnification viewfinder for easier focusing with long lenses and more accurate focusing with fast lenses, such as the 50mm/f1.0 Noctilux and 75mm/f1.4 Summilux. The 28mm framelines are dropped in this model. 3,130 of these cameras were made (all black chrome), so they are among the rarer non-commemorative M6's.

 M6 TTL – 1998–2002. With .72 and .85 viewfinder versions. In 2000 the .58 viewfinder camera for eyeglass wearers are added to the line. Supported TTL flash. The added electronics added 2mm of height to the top plate, and the shutter dial was reversed from previous models (traditionally, turning clockwise increased shutter speed).
 M7 2002–2018. Has TTL exposure, aperture priority and manual exposure, an electronic shutter, and two mechanical speeds of 1/60 and 1/125. Comes in .58, .72, and .85 viewfinder formats, each with different brightline frame lines. Same taller top plate and counterclockwise shutter dial as the M6 TTL. Leica even produced an M7 made of solid titanium and offered it in a kit with 1 or several titanium-colored lenses.
 MP – 2003 – current model (as of 2020). 35 mm film. A homage to the original MP, the new MP (this time standing for "Mechanical Perfection") cosmetically resembles the original (even down to changing the rewind crank back to a knob) but is functionally closer to the M6 Classic. A notable improvement over the M6 was the modification of the rangefinder to eliminate flare. The Leicavit M is an accessory introduced with the new MP, allowing trigger wind with the right hand at speeds up to 2–2.5 frame/s. The MP is available in chrome and black paint and with viewfinders of .58, .72 and .85 magnification.
 M-A (typ 127) – 2014 – current model (as of 2021). A 35mm film camera with no light meter or other electronic components. It is available in silver chrome or black chrome and has a .72 magnification viewfinder as standard.
 M6 reissue – 2022 – current model (as of 2022). An MP variant with cosmetic changes to closely but not exactly replicate an early production M6. Features brass top and bottom plates, "Leitz" red dot logo, "ERNST LEITZ WETZLAR GERMANY" top plate engraving, M11-type abrasion-resistant black lacquer and leatherette, and "MADE IN GERMANY" embossing on the back. It is available in black paint with viewfinder magnification of 0.72.
 à la carte program – 2004 – June 7, 2019. Program to facilitate custom-built combinations of metal finish, leather type, viewfinder magnification, and custom engraving of some current Leica models (e.g., the M-A (typ 127) is not eligible).

M (rangefinder) digital series 
 M8 – 2006–2009. The M8 was the first digital M introduced, featuring a 10.3-megapixel sensor. The sensor is a 1.3 crop of standard 35mm film, which gives the M8 an enlarged perspective in comparison to its predecessors.
 M8.2 – 2008–09. A slightly updated edition of the Leica M8, featuring a quieter shutter, sapphire glass LCD screen cover, new leather coatings, etc. Because both the M8 and M8.2 sensors lack an infrared filter, an IR-cut filter in front of the lens is required to render some synthetic material colors correctly.

 M9 – 2009 – The first full frame digital camera in the series, introduced on September 9, 2009.
 M9-P – 2011 – The full frame digital camera with a classic look, introduced in June/July 2011.
 M Monochrom – 2012 – Announced in May 2012, scheduled for retail sale in July 2012. A version of the M9 that shoots exclusively in monochrome. The sensor lacks both a color filtering array and an anti-aliasing filter.
 M-E (Typ 220) – 2012 – Announced in September 2012, entry-level model in the Leica M full-frame digital camera range.
 Leica M (Typ 240) – 2012 – Announced in September 2012.
 Leica M-P (Typ 240) – 2014 – Announced in August 2014, 2 GB buffer and sapphire LCD cover.
 Leica M Monochrom (Typ 246) – 2015 – Announced in April 2015, 2 GB buffer and sapphire LCD cover.
 Leica M (Typ 262) – 2015 – Announced in November 2015, no video and live view, aluminum top plate.
 Leica M-D (Typ 262) – 2016 – Announced in April 2016, no back screen.
 Leica M10 – 2017 – Announced in January 2017, the slimmest digital M-camera to date, identical dimensions as the M series film cameras, ISO control knob on the top plate.
 Leica M10-P – 2018 – Announced in August 2018, 24MP compact camera. The M10P has quieter shutter than the M10.
 Leica M10-D – 2018 – Announced in October 2018, no back screen.
 Leica M-E (Typ 240) – 2019 – Announced in June 2019, entry-level model based on the M (Typ 240).
 Leica M10 Monochrom - 2020 – Announced in January 2020, Monochrom version of the M10 with 40 megapixels sensor.
 Leica M10-R - 2020 – Announced in July 2020, High resolution version of the M10 with 40 megapixels sensor.
 Leica M11 - 2022 – Announced in January 2022, full-frame BSI CMOS sensor (60 megapixels, 36 megapixels or 18 megapixels).

Single-lens reflex

Leicaflex

Leicaflex is a range of high-end SLR cameras by Leitz created as a reaction to the booming SLR market in East Asia.
 Leicaflex (1964-1968) – Due to the phenomenal success of the Nikon F (1959), Leitz felt a great deal of pressure to introduce a Leica SLR. The first Leicaflex model is sometimes referred to as Standard. It has a built-in external light meter, clear focusing screen with center microprism spot. The Leicaflex Standard is extremely expensive to manufacturer, and so Leitz relied on the sale of the R-Series of lenses to recoup the cost. Leitz is also missing the expertise the Japanese have in the SLR market, and so the Leicaflex was heavily criticized for missing some important features despite its expensive pricing. Only 37,500 units were made during its production run (mostly in standard chrome), while only about 1,000 units came with the black paint. Production ended in 1968.

 Leicaflex SL/SL MOT (1968-1974) – The second Leicaflex model came with an SL moniker which stands for Selective Light. It features a TTL selective-area metering, and a slightly taller body than its predecessor. An SL MOT model was also launched. It is the same Leicaflex SL camera but with support for a large and heavy Leicaflex motor drive. This model sold over 70,000 units, with production ending in 1974. 
 Leicaflex SL2/SL2 MOT (1974-1976) – The Leicaflex SL2 is the third and the last Leicaflexes ever made. This model is a refinement of the Leicaflex SL with a more sensitive light meter and improved body shape. This was thought to be one of the toughest SLR ever made despite of the cost-cutting measure Leitz made to ensure sustainability. The Leica Solms Museum has an SL2 MOT on display, with a motor drive and a 35mm Summicron lens. The unit is said to have survived a  fall from a Phantom II fighter jet. It was battered but impressively remained in one piece which deemed repairable by Leica itself. It reportedly cost Leitz more to manufacture than it recouped in sales and motivated the company to collaborate with Minolta for their next series of electronic cameras. The SL2 was also the last mechanical Leica SLR for 14 years. Only about 1,000 SL2 MOTs were made, with the production ending just two years after its launch (the shortest market run for the Leicaflex range).

R series

The Leica R SLR is a range of economy and high-end Leica SLRs mostly based on Minolta models.
 Leica R3 (1976) – The Leica R3 is the first electronic Leitz SLR based upon the Minolta XE/Minolta XE-1/XE-7. This is a result of Leica's collaboration with Minolta. The first few were built in Germany and then production was transferred to the Leitz Portugal factory. While the design is mostly Minolta, Leitz made some Leica specific adjustments and upgrade to the unit.
 Leica R4 (1980) – The Leica R4 is a new compact model based upon the Minolta XD-7/Minolta XD-11. The R4 set the design for all cameras up to and including the R7. The R4 offered Program Mode, Aperture and Shutter Priority, and Manual, with Selective and Center-weighted metering. The original R4 MOT differed in designation only; all R4S and up accepted motors and winders. The Leica R4S, R4SP, and R4S Mod2 were simplified Leica R4 models at slightly lower prices. The "S" moniker stands for "Simplified", while the "SP" stands for "Simplified Professional".
 Leica R5 (1987) – The Leica R5 feature revised electronics and had TTL flash capability. Leica also launched a model called the Leica R-E. The Leica R-E was a simplified economy model of the Leica R5 produced between 1990 and 1994. It is basically a Leica R5 without the Program and Shutter Priority mode. Only about 6,000 Leica R-E was ever produced.
 Leica R6 (1988) – The Leica R6 has a mechanical shutter, relied on battery power only for the built-in light meter. A model called the Leica R6.2 was also released.
 Leica R7 (1992) – The Leica R7 added more advanced electronics to the R Series. This is also the last R Series Leica SLR made in collaboration with Minolta.
 Leica R8 (1996) – The Leica R8 features a complete redesign, this time in-house with production relocated back to Germany. All traces of Minolta are gone.
 Leica R9 (2002) – The Leica R9 was an improved version of the Leica R8 with 100g less weight and a new anthracite body finish. This model and its range of lenses were discontinued in 2009. This is the last R Series SLR Leica launched in the market.
R8/R9 DMR Digital Module-R – 10-megapixel digital back for the R8/R9, making them the first 35mm SLR cameras able to capture to film or digitally. This unit was discontinued in 2008.
 Leica R10 – While Leica announced in July 2009 that an R10 is forthcoming, so far one has not been released, and is unlikely given previous announcements from Leica.

Leica also makes a line of cine lenses used for cinematic projects. In February 2015, their design team was awarded an Academy Scientific and Engineering Award for the optical and mechanical design of the Leica Summilux-C lenses.

L-mount mirrorless (dual-scale sensors and lenses) 
The Leica L-mount was first introduced by the Leica T (Typ 701), an APS-C mirrorless camera, in April 2014. In October 2015, the second camera, Leica SL (typ 601), was introduced. The SL is a full frame mirrorless camera. The two camera mounts are mechanically and electronically 100% compatible. The only difference is a small gap around the SL mount for the SL lens sealing to cover dust and spray on the Leica SL.

SL-series (full-frame sensor) 
  Leica SL (Typ 601) is a full frame 35 mm format mirrorless system camera announced by Leica on October 20, 2015. The Leica SL is promoted as a camera system for professional applications. Beside the Leica S-System, the Leica SL-System is the second professional camera in the company's product portfolio.

TL- and CL-series (APS-C sensor with matched lenses) 
Leica T (Typ 701) – In 2014, Leica announced Leica T (Typ 701), the first camera with a body made completely of aluminum. Initially there were two available lenses for the camera, the Leica Summicron-T 23mm  ASPH and the Leica Vario-Elmar-T 18–56 mm –5.6 ASPH. More lenses have been announced for 2015.
Leica TL – The Leica TL is the successor of the Leica T (Typ 701).

Leica TL2 – The Leica TL2 is the successor of the Leica TL.
Leica CL – The camera was introduced November 21, 2017.

Non-Leica (Sigma and Panasonic) 
Sigma and Panasonic joined forces with Leica to form the L-mount Alliance on 25 September 2018 and license the L-mount system for their own lines of lenses and cameras.

Three forthcoming cameras were announced on the same day as the alliance:
Panasonic S1 and S1R full-frame cameras for release in early 2019
As-yet unnamed Sigma full-frame camera using the company's Foveon sensor, also for release in 2019

S-series reflex (digital medium format) 

 Leica S1 – The Leica S1 Pro is a scanner camera with a very high resolution (26 megapixels) for stationary use introduced in 1996. On a 36×36 mm sensor 5140×5140 pixels get scanned and optically transferred to a connected computer. The object lens adapter system was exchangeable, thus object lenses of the systems Leica R, Leica M, Hasselblad, Mamiya 4, 5×6, and all mechanic object lenses from Canon (FD), Nikon, etc. can be used with the S1. The software for the S1 is a special SilverFast version, originally developed by LaserSoft Imaging for high-end scanners. Approximately 160 cameras were built and mostly sold to museums, archives and research institutes. Later on Leica introduced the S1 Highspeed with very quick scanning and the S1 Alpha with half the resolution to the market.
 Leica S2 – In 2008, Leica announced plans to offer an S-System – DSLR with a Kodak-made custom CCD image sensor measuring 30×45 mm and containing 37 million pixels. This sensor has a 26% longer diagonal and 56% larger area than a "full-frame″ 24×36 mm DSLR sensor and outputs an approximately 5000x7500 pixel image. The Leica S2 is thus essentially a medium format camera in a "35 mm SLR"-sized body. The new "Maestro" image processor used in the S2 was developed by Fujitsu based on the Milbeaut and the autofocus system (Leica's first to see production) was developed in house. The S2 series body, lenses and accessories were available in 2009. A series of new Leica lenses is manufactured specifically for the S2 and Leica claims they offer unsurpassed resolution and contrast at all apertures and focusing distances, even exceeding the sensor's capabilities. Lenses offered for the S2 include Summarit-S in normal (70mm), wide-angle (35mm), and macro (120mm) varieties, and Tele-Elmar (180 mm) portrait-length telephotos; these are available in versions that feature integrated multi-leaf blade shutters ("Central Shutter", or CS), in addition to the focal-plane shutter in the camera body, to enable higher flash sync speeds.

 Leica S (Typ 006) – Leica announced the Leica S (Typ 006) in September 2012. It replaces the Leica S2, having a new sensor board with improved noise characteristics.
 Leica S (Typ 007) – Leica announced the Leica S (Typ 007) in September 2014. It replaces the Typ 006's CCD with a new CMOS image sensor. It offers improved noise characteristics, stills at 3.5 frames/second, and 4K video.
 Leica S3 – Leica announced the Leica S3 in October 2018. The camera specs were finally released in early 2020, to be available for sale in the spring.

Q-series large-sensor compact cameras 

Leica Q (Type 116) compact full frame camera with a Summilux 28 mm  ASPH lens was officially announced on June 10, 2015. Its successor, the Leica Q2 with a 47.3 Megapixel full frame sensor, was launched in March 2019.
And in November 2020, the company released a monochrome version of the camera, the Q2 Monochrom, using a sensor similar to that in the M10 Monochrom, but with 47.3 megapixels.

Sofort-series instant cameras 
Leica Sofort was announced in September 2016 at Photokina. It is Leica's first instant film camera and is compatible with both Leica's own film packs as well as Fuji Instax Mini film. It features a 60mm lens, modes for normal and macro photography and a host of pre-sets for applications like selfies and fast moving sports photography.

Early digital cameras

Digilux-series digital system cameras 

 Digilux
 Digilux Zoom
 Digilux 4.3
 Digilux 1
 Digilux 2
 Digilux 3
 R8/R9 DMR Digital Module R (DSLR)

Digital compact camera series 
 C-Lux series (year of introduction)
C-LUX 1 (2006)
C-LUX 2 (2007)
C-LUX 3 (2008)
C-LUX (2018)
 D-Lux series (year of introduction)
D-LUX (2003)
D-LUX 2 (2005)
D-LUX 3 (2006)
D-LUX 4 (2008)
D-LUX 5 (2010)
D-LUX 6 (2012)
D-LUX (Typ 109) (2014)
D-LUX 7 (2018)

 V-Lux bridge camera series (year of introduction)
V-LUX 1 (2006)
V-LUX 20 (2010)
V-LUX 2 (2010)
V-LUX 30 (2011)
V-LUX 3 (2011)
V-LUX 40 (2012)
V-LUX 4 (2012)
V-LUX (Typ 114) (2014)
V-LUX 5 (2019)
 X series
Introduced with the Leica X1 on September 9, 2009. APS-C size sensor in a compact body. No viewfinder (hotshoe finder optional), fixed prime lens.

In May 2012, the company introduced its successor, the Leica X2.

In 2013, the Leica X Vario (Typ 107) was announced: a compact body with a 16.2 MP APS-C size sensor, a fixed variable-aperture zoom (F3.5 – F6.4, 28–70 mm equivalent) and no viewfinder (plug-in electronic viewfinder optional).

In 2014, Leica announced two updates on the series: the Leica X-E (Typ 102) featuring a 24 mm  lens and the Leica X (Typ 113) which has a 23mm  lens.
 C series
On September 8, 2013, Leica announced the Leica C (Typ 112), a compact camera with an electronic viewfinder based on the Panasonic DMC-LF1.

Compact film cameras

C (point and shoot) series 
 AF-C1 (1989)
 C2 Zoom (1991)
 Z2X (1997–2001)
 Leica CM 40 mm (2003–2006)
 Leica CM Zoom (2003–2006)

Mini series 
 Leica Mini (1991–1993)
 Leica Mini II (1993–1996)
 Leica Mini Zoom (1993–1997): Zoom lenses Vario Elmar 35-70 with luminous intensity 1:4-7,6. The design of the camera was created by Manfred Meinzer with Klaus-Dieter Schaefer. The Mini Zoom was manufactured by Kyocera for Leica Camera.
 Leica Mini III (1996–1997)

Minilux series 
 Leica Minilux 40 mm (1995–2003)
 Leica Minilux Zoom (1998–2003)
The design is by Klaus-Dieter Schaefer
and Manfred Meinzer, who made the design of the analogous Leica R8 and digital Leica S2, too.

Cx series 
 C1 (2000–2005)
 C2 2002 made in China
 C3 (2002–2005)

Co-operation

L-Mount Alliance with Sigma and Panasonic 

During the 2018 Photokina in Cologne, Leica announced that Sigma and Panasonic had become licencees of the L-mount platform. The three companies would form a strategic and technical alliance, yet remain independent.

Leica and Panasonic 

Leica-branded lenses, such as some Nocticron, Elmarit and Summilux lenses, have been used on many Panasonic (Matsushita) digital cameras (Lumix) and video recorders since 1995. Panasonic/Leica models were the first to incorporate optical image stabilization in their digital cameras. Several Panasonic/Leica lenses have been produced for the Micro Four Thirds mount, including the 12 mm  Summilux, 15 mm  Summilux and 25 mm  Summilux prime lenses, and zooms including a 12–60 mm  and 100–400 mm .

Leica and Valbray 

In 2014, to commemorate Leica camera's 100th anniversary, they partnered with Swiss watch manufacture Valbray to develop a limited edition chronograph wristwatch with Valbray's signature Leica aperture inspired dial.

Leica and Huawei 

Since 2016, Leica has established partnership with the Chinese telecommunications company Huawei, and Leica cameras will be co-engineered into Huawei smartphones, including the P series and Mate series. The first smartphone to be co-engineered with a Leica camera was the Huawei P9. The partnership ended with the Huawei P50 series in 2021.

Leitz and Minolta 

Leica and Minolta signed a technical cooperation agreement in June 1972.

 Minolta XE chassis became the basis for the Leica R3 SLR – cooperative development with Copal on the 'Copal-Leitz Square' electronic shutter module, with advanced gear train and self-timer. 
 Minolta XD chassis and microelectronics became the basis for the Leica R4 SLR.
 Several lenses for the above cameras including the MC/MD 24mm F2.8 (Leica Elmarit-R, glass by Minolta but case Made In Germany); the (1983) MD Zoom 35–70 F3.5 (Vario-Elmar-R); (1978) Minolta MD 75–200 F4.5.
 Leica 'Leitz-Minolta' CL and CLE (Compact Leica Electronic)
 Minolta co-designed and produced the following lenses for the above cameras: 
 M-Rokkor 40mm F2 (Summicron-C – Made in Germany); 
 M-Rokkor 90mm F4 'Made by Leitz in Germany' (Elmar-C – Made in Germany and later in Japan by Minolta). This lens was solely designed by Minolta, being remarkable for one of a few Japanese lenses to be made in Germany. The lens elements were produced by Minolta in Japan. 
 M-Rokkor 28mm F2.8. This lens is not the same as any of the Leica M 28mm F2.8's, being a 7 element, 5 group design while contemporary Leicas were 8e/6g (Elmarit II '72–'79 and Elmarit-M III '79–'93). The M-Rokkor was sold for about less than half the price – however Modern Photography tests indicated that performance was as good as the Leica equivalent. This is supported by user experiences and modern tests.

Leica and Insta360 
In 2020, Leica entered a strategic partnership with Insta360 to help produce the ONE R 1-Inch Edition. Since then, ONE R has been recognised as one of TIME magazine's best inventions of 2020.

Leica and Sharp 
In 2021, Leica has established technology partnership with Sharp Corporation, and Leica cameras will be co-engineered into Sharp smartphones for the Japanese market only. The first smartphone to be co-engineered with a Leica camera was the AQUOS R6 with 1-inch-sensor camera. Then Leica with the SoftBank introduced the smartphone Leitz Phone 1 which have same specifications as AQUOS R6 but different design.

Leica and Xiaomi 

In 2022, Leica entered a strategic partnership with Xiaomi to jointly develop Leica cameras to be used in Xiaomi flagship smartphones, succeeding the partnership between Huawei and Leica. The first flagship smartphones under this new partnership were the Xiaomi 12S Ultra and Xiaomi MIX Fold 2, launched in July and August 2022, respectively.

Leica lenses

Leica / Leitz enlargers 

 Leitz Valoy and Valoy II – manual focus, later versions of the Valoy II were grey in colour. Valoy II normally equipped with Focotar 50 mm f1:4.5 code name DOOCQ, and used with extension ring DOORX.
 Leitz Focomat Ia – same as Focomat 1C, that is with autofocus, but the head does not tilt back to allow for easy insertion of negative.
 Leitz Focomat Ib
 Leitz Focomat Ic – sometimes fitted with Kienzle colour head. Produced with Focotar 50 mm f1:4.5 and 2nd version Focotar-2 50 mm f1:4.5. Changes in Focotar name or focal length designation do not necessarily coincide with the optical formula. The Focotar-2 was always the same formula. The 50 mm exists in two versions. The 1c helical accommodates lenses of various makes. Available in "Color" version with filter drawer and lighted enlargement factor scale. Many small design variations exist.
 Leitz Focomat IIa – 35 mm–6×9 format, dual lens turret on later versions that fitted a 5 cm Elmar f1:3.5 or Focotar 1:4.5, and a 9.5 cm f1:4.5 Focotar, autofocus. The early version has a single helical that accommodates lenses of any make. Available in "Color" version with filter drawer and lighted enlargement factor scale.
 Leitz Focomat IIc – 35 mm–6×9 formats, dual lens stage rather than turret, autofocus. First produced with Focotar 6 cm f1:4.5 and Focotar 9.5 cm f1:4.5, later with Focotar 60 mm and V-Elmar 100 mm f1:4.5, still later with Focotar 60 mm and Focotar II 100 mm f1:5.6. 6 cm and 60 mm Focotars appear to be the same optical design. Kienzle or other colour heads sometime fitted. Only very slender enlarging lenses fit the IIc helicals. Available in "color" version with filter drawer and lighted enlargement factor scale.
 Leitz Focomat II (modified for American military), code EN-121A – extremely rare
 Vincent electrical shutter (for enlarger) – extremely rare
 ELCAN 52mm enlarger lens (20×–25× enlargements) – extremely rare
 ELCAN 20mm enlarger lens (40×–75× enlargements) – extremely rare
 Leitz/Leica Focomat V35 – mechanical autofocus – 40 mm  Focotar lens – colour or Multigrade (variable contrast) heads. 1978–95. With the 40 mm lens – wider than normal – the V35 could make 16x20 prints (16x) directly on the baseboard, and larger prints if the baseboard was reversed for floor projection.

Financials 
Leica was traded as LCA1 on the Frankfurt stock exchange until October 2012.

See also 
 Wild Heerbrugg
 Heinrich Wild
 Hektor (lens)
 The Leica Historical Society of America
 Leica reel
 Valbray

References

External links

 

 

German companies established in 1869
German brands
Lens manufacturers
Optics manufacturing companies
Photography companies of Germany
The Blackstone Group companies
Wetzlar
Articles containing video clips